Llysworney is a small village in the Vale of Glamorgan, South Wales, in the community of Llandow.

Llysworney is home to about 240 people and has around 100 houses. It is situated about 2 miles away from Cowbridge in the Vale of Glamorgan. It is in the historic county of Glamorgan. The B4268 runs through the village. The Village is home to the locally well-known Carne Arms Pub, St. Tydfils Church, a duck pond, and Llysworney Garage.

Notable landmarks

The Carne Arms 
Dating back over 400 years the Carne Arms is an old inn with open fires. Thought to have originally been part of the local Rectory, it is named after the Carne family, who were wealthy landowners in the local area.

St. Tydfils Church

Friendly, all-age congregation worshipping in an ancient church with a most unusual groundplan. Regular Sunday worship.

(Text from Diocese of Llandaff Page)

Worney Wood
The wood was founded in the millennium year of 2000. The wood is kept by the Woodland Trust and is sponsored by Homebase. The wood was planted by locals and is open Free 24 hours, 7 days a week. Worney Wood allows dogs. Worney wood hosts a range of trees and hedgerows. For more information visit the Woodland Trust page

External links

Village website
Another link about the village
Photos of Llysworney and surrounding area on geograph

Villages in the Vale of Glamorgan